Liga Deportiva Universitaria de Quito's 1988 season was the club's 58th year of existence, the 35th year in professional football and the 28th in the top level of professional football in Ecuador.

Kits
Sponsor(s): Banco de la Producción

Competitions

Serie A

First stage

Results

Second stage

Results

References
RSSSF - 1988 Serie A

External links
Official Site 

1988